Birdshill Quarry is a Site of Special Scientific Interest (SSSI) in Carmarthenshire, Wales.

SSSI

The SSSI citation for Birshill Quarry specifies the importance of the site to be the abundant fossils of trilobites,  brachiopods  and  bivalves in an Ashgill Birdshill Limestone strata of the quarry, incorporated as deposits some 425 million years ago. The site has been dated by reference to microfossil conodonts found in the strata.

See also
List of Sites of Special Scientific Interest in Carmarthenshire

References

External links
SSSI Citation for Birdshill Quarry
Citation map for Birdshill Quarry
Your Special Site and its Future - Birdshill SSSI overview from Natural Resources Wales
Birdshill SSSI marked on DEFRA's MAGIC Map

Quarries in Wales
Sites of Special Scientific Interest in Carmarthen & Dinefwr